Cameron Turner (born July 29, 1987) is an American football coach who is the quarterbacks coach for the Indianapolis Colts of the National Football League (NFL). He previously served as an assistant coach for the Carolina Panthers and Minnesota Vikings.

Playing career

The Citadel
Cameron Turner played quarterback and wide receiver for The Citadel from 2006 to 2009. After redshirting his freshman year, Turner played two seasons at quarterback before injuring his shoulder and switching to wide receiver.

Coaching career

The Citadel
After graduating from The Citadel, Turner began his coaching career in 2010, working with wide receivers and special teams at his alma mater The Citadel.

Minnesota Vikings
Turner got his first job in the NFL in 2011, where he was the assistant to head coach Leslie Frazier.

FIU
In 2013, Cameron Turner was hired as to coach quarterbacks and wide receivers for FIU. Cameron joined his father Ron Turner, who was hired as head coach at FIU.

Carolina Panthers
On February 11, 2015, Turner was hired by the Carolina Panthers as assistant wide receivers. On March 2, 2017, Turner was named assistant quarterbacks coach.

Arizona Cardinals
On February 14, 2018 Turner was hired by the Arizona Cardinals as an offensive assistant under head coach Steve Wilks. On February 6, 2019 it was announcer that Turner had been retained under new head coach Kliff Kingsbury with the added title of assistant quarterbacks coach. On January 7, 2021, Turner was promoted to the Cardinals' quarterbacks coach, replacing Tom Clements, who announced his retirement from coaching. On May 10, 2022, Turner was promoted to the Cardinals' co–pass game coordinator along with Spencer Whipple.

Indianapolis Colts
On March 1, 2023, Turner was hired as quarterbacks coach for the Indianapolis Colts.

Personal life
Turner is the son of former FIU head coach Ron Turner, nephew of Norv Turner and the cousin of Scott Turner, the current offensive coordinator of the Washington Commanders.

References

External links
 Arizona Cardinals bio

1987 births
Living people
American football quarterbacks
American football wide receivers
Arizona Cardinals coaches
Carolina Panthers coaches
Minnesota Vikings coaches
The Citadel Bulldogs football coaches
The Citadel Bulldogs football players
FIU Panthers football coaches
Players of American football from Illinois